Eliyahu "Eli" Dalal (born 24 February 1955) is an Israeli politician from Likud who was elected to the Knesset for Likud in the 2022 elections.

He previously served as deputy mayor of Netanya.

References

See also 
 List of members of the twenty-fifth Knesset

1955 births
Living people
Likud politicians
21st-century Israeli politicians
Jewish Israeli politicians
People from Netanya
Tel Aviv University alumni
Members of the 25th Knesset (2022–)